Griebel is a German surname. Notable people with the surname include:

George Henry Griebel
John H. Griebel
Harald Griebel
Michael Griebel
Oz Griebel
Rolf Griebel
Sophia Griebel

See also
Tekla Griebel-Wandall

German-language surnames